China Qiyuan is an official agency responsible for board games and card games such as go, bridge, chess and Chinese chess affairs under the All-China Sports Federation of the People's Republic of China.

It oversees the Chinese Weiqi Association, the Chinese Chess Association, the Chinese Xiangqi Association and the Chinese Contract Bridge Association.

List of presidents
Chen Zude (陈祖德): 1992 - 2003
Wang Runan (王汝南): 2003 - 2007
Hua Yigang (华以刚): 2007 – June 2009
Liu Siming (刘思明): June 2009 - January 2015
Zhu Guoping (朱国平): September 2018 - Present

See also
Chess in China

External links

Qi
Go organizations